Effingham Junction railway station is just north of the far northern border of the village of Effingham, closer to the centre of East Horsley, homes of which it borders, in Surrey, England. Although the station takes its name from the former settlement, and the immediate vicinity has itself become known as Effingham Junction, it is actually in the latter. Effingham Junction is at the junction of the New Guildford Line, from London Waterloo to Guildford, and the line from Leatherhead, which carries trains from Waterloo via Epsom. It is  down the line from Waterloo.

History
The London and South Western Railway opened the station on 2 July 1888, three years after completing the two routes that serve it.  Both routes were subsequently electrified by the Southern Railway in 1925 and for many years it served as the terminus for trains from the Epsom direction, with a seven-road carriage shed south of the station provided by the SR to allow empty EMU sets to be reversed and stabled clear of the main running lines.  This still stands, though it ceased to be used for carriage storage in 1993 – it is now used by Colas Rail as a maintenance base for Network Rail MPVs and track machines.

The station is managed and primarily serviced by South Western Railway, though Southern also provides some peak period services. The latter are a holdover from the British Rail-era timetables of the 1970s and 1980s, when the Epsom line had regular services to London Victoria as well as to Waterloo.

Facilities
The station has a ticket office which is open during weekday and Saturday mornings only. At other times, there are self-service ticket machines available for ticket purchases. There are also toilets at the station which are open when the station is staffed. Both platforms have covered seating areas, information screens and help points.

There is a chargeable car park and large bicycle storage facility located at the station. Step-free access is available to the Guildford bound platform only.

Services
All services at Effingham Junction are operated by South Western Railway using  EMUs.

The typical off-peak service in trains per hour is:
 3 tph to 

Additional services run via Epsom during the peak hours, increasing the service to 4 tph in each direction.

References

Literature
Body, G. (1984), PSL Field Guides - Railways of the Southern Region, Patrick Stephens Ltd, Cambridge,

External links

Railway stations in Surrey
Former London and South Western Railway stations
Railway stations in Great Britain opened in 1888
Railway stations served by South Western Railway
Rail junctions in England